Massimo Arduini (born 4 February 1960) is an Italian auto tourism  racing driver. He competed in the Italian Touring Car Championship, and was champion in 2007 with a Honda Civic. In the same year he took part in ETCC., and in 2008 won the ITCC in a Honda Accord for Team Mercurio GPS.  
In 2010 won the Italian championship super production with AMG C class.
In 2015 won the Italian championship 1.6 turbo .
In 2016 He took part to motorshow in Bologna and arrived second overall with Citroen C3 MAX, losing the first place for 0.03".
In 2017 Arduini is competing in the TCT series as the official Peugeot Italy pilot with 308 RC, coaching the Italian actor Stefano Accorsi.

External links
 Profile and report on Italian site.

1960 births
Living people
Italian racing drivers
European Touring Car Cup drivers